David Rytman Slavitt (born 1935) is an American writer, poet, and translator, the author of more than 100 books.

Slavitt has written a number of novels and numerous translations from Greek, Latin, and other languages. Slavitt wrote a number of popular novels under the pseudonym Henry Sutton, starting in the late 1960s. The Exhibitionist (1967) was a bestseller and sold over four million copies. He has also published popular novels under the names of David Benjamin, Lynn Meyer, and Henry Lazarus. His first work, a book of poems titled Suits for the Dead, was published in 1961. He worked as a writer and film critic for Newsweek from 1958 to 1965.

According to Henry S. Taylor, winner of the 1986 Pulitzer Prize for Poetry, "David Slavitt is among the most accomplished living practitioners" of writing, "in both prose and verse; his poems give us a pleasurable, beautiful way of meditating on a bad time. We can't ask much more of literature, and usually we get far less." Novelist and poet James Dickey wrote, "Slavitt has such an easy, tolerant, believable relationship with the ancient world and its authors that making the change-over from that world to ours is less a leap than an enjoyable stroll. The reader feels a continual sense of gratitude."

Biography

Personal life
Slavitt was born in White Plains, New York on March 23, 1935, the son of lawyer Samuel Saul Slavitt and Adele Beatrice Slavitt, a paralegal.

Slavitt attended Phillips Academy in Andover, Massachusetts, where his first writing teacher was Dudley Fitts.  He received an undergraduate degree from Yale University (where he studied under Cleanth Brooks and Robert Penn Warren and was elected class poet, "Scholar of the House," in 1956), graduating with a Bachelor of Arts (magna cum laude), and then a Master's degree in English from Columbia University in 1957.

He was married to Lynn Nita Meyer on August 27, 1956. They had three children: Evan Meyer, Sarah Rebecca, and Joshua Rytman; while raising their young children, the Slavitts lived for some years in Miami, Florida. Slavitt and his first wife were divorced on December 20, 1977.

Slavitt's Florida house was burgled during the summer of 1973. His family were no longer happy to live in Miami; they moved to live in Cambridge, Massachusetts. For a short time he lived in Belmont. He then met Janet Lee Abrahm, later to be Professor of Medicine at Harvard Medical School, and they were married on April 16, 1978. Abrahm was appointed Chief Resident at Moffitt Hospital of University of California, San Francisco, where they lived for a year. Together, they moved to Philadelphia, where Abrahm had earned a fellowship; they moved to Boston in 2000, when she was hired at Harvard University.

Slavitt's mother was murdered in 1978 by a teen-aged burglar, who was convicted and imprisoned. Slavitt's poetry, which rings many emotional changes, became darker, by his own admission.

Slavitt remains close to his children, and he said proudly in a 2011 interview: "What amazes me is not the 100 books, but the fact that I am 76 and have nine grandchildren."

Politically, he has identified himself as a Republican. He and his first wife are Jewish and raised their children in that faith.

He lives in Cambridge, Massachusetts.

Writing career

Before becoming a full-time freelance writer in 1965, Slavitt worked at various jobs in the literary field. These included a stint in the personnel office of Reader's Digest in Pleasantville, New York; teaching English at the Georgia Institute of Technology in Atlanta (1957–1958); and a variety of jobs at Newsweek in New York. Slavitt began there as a mailroom clerk, was promoted to the positions of book reviewer and film critic, and earned the position of associate editor from 1958 to 1963. He edited the movies pages from 1963 to 1965.

Okla Elliott, a professor and Illinois Distinguished Fellow at the University of Illinois at Urbana–Champaign, has written of Slavitt that he "served as an associate editor at Newsweek until 1965, teaching himself Greek on his 35-minute commute. In his last two years at Newsweek, he had a reputation as an astute, sometime cranky, but always readable 'flicker picker' and gained some notoriety for his film reviews there."

Slavitt taught as an assistant professor at the University of Maryland, College Park, in 1977, and at Temple University, in Philadelphia, as associate professor from 1978 to 1980. Slavitt was a lecturer at Columbia University from 1985 to 1986, at Rutgers University in 1987, and at the University of Pennsylvania in 1991. He has served as a visiting professor at the University of Texas at El Paso and other institutions. He has given poetry readings at colleges and universities, at the Folger Shakespeare Library, and at the Library of Congress.

In the 1960s, Slavitt was approached by Bernie Geis & Associates to write a big book, a popular book, which he agreed to if he could use a pseudonym. As Henry Sutton, in 1967 he published The Exhibitionist, which sold more than 4 million copies. He followed this with The Voyeur in 1968 and three more novels as Henry Sutton. In the 1970s, he also used the pen names of Lynn Meyer and Henry Lazarus for novels written for the popular market.

Slavitt has published numerous works in translation, especially classics, from Greek, Latin, Hebrew, Spanish and French.

Politics
In 2004, Slavitt unsuccessfully ran as a Republican for a seat in the Massachusetts House of Representatives, losing to longtime incumbent Timothy J. Toomey Jr. His campaign manager was former Cambridge School Committee candidate and Republican City Committee Chairman Fred Baker.  He explored the race in his 2006 non-fiction book Blue State Blues: How a Cranky Conservative Launched a Campaign and Found Himself the Liberal Candidate (And Still Lost). Jonathan Yardley, reviewing the book, said that Slavitt "was challenged by his son Evan -- a Republican activist" to run, and that Slavitt described himself as "economically conservative and socially moderate."

Bibliography

Adaptations 

 Metamorphoses - Director, Mary Zimmerman; Repertory Theatre; St. Louis, Missouri; 2003.
 Trojan Women - Directors, Heidi Winters Vogel and Tom Martin; Saint Louis University Theatre; St. Louis, Missouri; 2005.
 Oedipus King - Director, Philip Boehm; Kranzberg Arts Center / Gaslight Theater, St. Louis, Missouri; 2010. 
 Antigone - Director, Philip Boehm; Upstream Theater, St. Louis, Missouri; 2014.

Critical reception 

Henry S. Taylor, a winner of the 1986 Pulitzer Prize for Poetry, wrote in 1992:

It has been twenty-five years since David R. Slavitt invented Henry Sutton and embarked on a series of schlock novels under that pseudonym, but it is still fun to recall people's outrage when they learned that The Exhibitionist was the work of someone who had also written more serious fiction, and even poetry. On one hand, people of Jacqueline Susann's ilk were irritated because someone had done easily and laughingly what they worked hard to do; on the other hand, purveyors of solemn literature were offended at the success of this prostitution of talent. Even Tom Wolfe, who had no reason to feel either envious or superior, took a cheap shot at Slavitt's next serious novel, saying in a review that it was not as good as The Exhibitionist.

Taylor adds:

From the beginning, Slavitt's poetry has been characterized by profound wit, neoclassical attention to form, and generous erudition.  Slavitt is also a master of tonal variety; within the same poem he can make shifts of tone that most poets would find too risky. ... Part of his success lies in his ability to deal with formal restrictions that are too much for most poets; though his stanza forms are often intricate, they never prevent, or even impede, the explorations of a mind that takes suggestions as they come, weaving them into the pattern.

R. H. W. Dillard, a noted critic at Hollins University, writes, "David Slavitt is one of the most prodigious writers working today. In book after book after book after book after book, he engages, amuses, delights, shocks, astounds, annoys, rouses, arouses, and generally awakens readers from the torpor that the works of too many (unnamed here) writers have cast them into."

In a lengthy review of Orlando Furioso: A New Verse Translation, critic Steve Baker writes admiringly that

David R. Slavitt has been playing fast and loose with the literary classics since the early 70s when he brought us free adaptations of the Eclogues and Georgics of Virgil, both of which present the original masterworks as filtered through – to put it in his words – the "radically improvisational" lens of the translator. In fact, Slavitt openly refers to these early works not as translations per se, but rather as "verse essays", in which he riffs playfully on the original texts. As renderings into English of Virgil's Latin, his translations of both the Eclogues and the Georgics represent an act of reading, a lively engagement with the original poems, as he transposes them from the distant and antique to the conversational and everyday. They do more to escort us through a reading of the poems than they do to present us with the original texts to read on our own. Shot through with the translator's commentary, dominated by paraphrase and dressed with satirical discussions of the propositional content of the originals, Slavitt's creations are not translations in any traditional sense. In bringing the uninitiated into uniquely colloquial contact with these timeless classics, they do, however, actually amount to pleasantly entertaining romps with the bucolic Virgil."

The Cliff (1994), Slavitt's novel about an impostor (one John Smith pretending to be another, more revered professor of the same name) at a literary retreat in Italy, received praise from many quarters. Publishers Weekly's reviewer wrote, "Smith's witty and playful narration entertains despite some conveniences in the plot. It is his attempt to retain a sense of basic human dignity, however - his desire to prove that he is not 'an altogether worthless person' - that lies at the heart of the novel and invests it with meaning and resonance." Georgia Jones-Davis, writing for the Los Angeles Times, speculated that "Slavitt is not so much telling a story as using his narrative to spoof everything he's probably come across in his distinguished and, let's face it, long academic career." Although Jones-Davis confusedly thought The Cliff "too self-consciously satirical to pass as a real novel," she found much to praise: "There are some wondrously funny moments. Our brilliant, moody, schlemiel of a narrator, a guy who can't even make his rent, is highly critical of the food served at this historic villa. ... The narrator's sincere attempts to reconcile with his alienated daughter are touching and not at all sentimental. The highlight of the book must be the narrator's scathing letter to the manager about the villa's terrible service and dismissive treatment of its guests." Magill Book Reviews wrote, "Slavitt's fiftieth book offers a satiric look at the cosseted world of creative and scholarly retreats, their beneficiaries, staffs, and administrators, as well as creative and academic life more generally."

Awards and honors
 Edgar Award Nominee for Best First Novel for Paperback Thriller, 1976
 Grant from Pennsylvania Council on the Arts, 1985
 National Endowment for the Arts Translation Fellowship, 1988
 Literature award, American Academy of Arts and Letters, 1989
 Rockefeller Foundation artist's residency, 1989. Slavitt used the time period of the retreat (November 3 - December 12, 1989) to work on a translation of the curse poem Ibis by the Latin poet Ovid.
 Kevin Kline Award, 2011, for Outstanding New Play or Musical: David Slavitt, translator (Oedipus King, Upstream Theater, St. Louis, Missouri)

References

External links

 "Operating A Circus Without A License: An Introduction to David R. Slavitt", Outpost 19, 2012
 
  Slavitt's page at Encyclopedia.com
 

1935 births
Living people
20th-century American novelists
21st-century American novelists
American male novelists
People from White Plains, New York
Writers from Cambridge, Massachusetts
Newsweek people
Yale University alumni
20th-century American poets
21st-century American poets
American male poets
20th-century translators
21st-century American translators
20th-century American male writers
21st-century American male writers
Novelists from Massachusetts
Translators of Virgil